Yanghua Township is an rural township in Liuyang City, Changsha City, Hunan Province, People's Republic of China. Yanghua merged to Dayao town on November 18, 2015.

Cityscape
The township is divided into 9 villages, the following areas: Yanghua Village, Duanli Village, Huayuan Village, Shandou Village, Dashan Village, Guange Village, Huanggangchong Village, Yingxin Village, and Laogui Village (杨花村、端里村、华园村、山斗村、大山村、观阁村、黄岗冲村、迎新村、老桂村).

References

Former township-level divisions of liuyang